Degeeriopsis is a genus of bristle flies in the family Tachinidae.

Species
Degeeriopsis apocola Shima, 1997
Degeeriopsis xanthogastra Mesnil, 1953

References

Exoristinae
Diptera of Asia
Tachinidae genera